Kriti (Sanskrit: कृति, kṛti) is a format of musical composition typical to Carnatic music. Kritis form the mental backbone of any typical Carnatic music concert and is the longer format of Carnatic song. "Kriti" also means Creation.

Structure
Conventional Kritis typically contain three parts
Pallavi, the equivalent of a refrain in Western music
Anupallavi, the second verse, which is sometimes optional
Charanam, the final (and longest) verse that wraps up the song

The charanam usually borrows patterns from the anupallavi. The charanam's last line usually contains the composer's signature, or mudra, with which the composer leaves their mark.

Variations
This verse consists only of notes, and has no words. Other krithis, particularly some of Oothukkadu Venkata Kavi and Muthuswami Dikshitar's compositions, are intentionally composed without an annupallavi, where the verse after the pallavi is called the samashti charanam.

There are krithi's, such as Thyagaraja's Enduku Nirdhaya that have no annupallavi but many short charanams. Often, the artists take up certain lines of a Krithi for neraval.  One of the greatest explorers of the krti form was Oottukkadu Venkata Kavi (1700–1765), who has created numerous varieties within this form, often with innovations in contrasting speeds, gaits (gatis) and lyrical variation (sahitya-sangatis), sectional partitioning and singular blending of rhythmic syllables and lyrics.

References

External links
Sivakumar Carnatic Music Archive Kriti collection

Carnatic music
Carnatic music terminology